Oxyaeninae ("sharp hyenas") is a extinct subfamily of oxyaenids from the late Paleocene to late Eocene of Asia, Europe and North America.

Etymology 
The name of the subfamily translates as "sharp hyaenas" (name of hyena genus Hyaena and taxonomic suffix "-inae").

Classification and phylogeny

Taxonomy 
 Subfamily: †Oxyaeninae (Cope, 1877)
 Genus: †Argillotherium (Davies, 1884)
 †Argillotherium toliapicum (Davies, 1884)
 Genus: †Dipsalidictis (Matthew & Granger, 1915) <−−−[paraphyletic genus]
 †Dipsalidictis aequidens (Matthew & Granger, 1915)
 †Dipsalidictis krausei (Gunnell & Gingerich, 1991)
 †Dipsalidictis platypus (Matthew & Granger, 1915)
 †Dipsalidictis transiens (Matthew & Granger, 1915)
 Genus: †Malfelis (Stucky & Hardy, 2007)
 †Malfelis badwaterensis (Stucky & Hardy, 2007)
 Genus: †Oxyaena (Cope, 1874)
 †Oxyaena forcipata (Cope, 1874)
 †Oxyaena gulo (Matthew & Granger, 1915)
 †Oxyaena intermedia (Denison, 1938)
 †Oxyaena lupina (Cope, 1874)
 †Oxyaena pardalis (Matthew & Granger, 1915)
 †Oxyaena simpsoni (Van Valen, 1966)
 †Oxyaena woutersi (Lange-Badré & Godinot, 1982)
 Genus: †Patriofelis (Leidy, 1870)
 †Patriofelis ferox (Marsh, 1872)
 †Patriofelis ulta (Leidy, 1870)
 Genus: †Protopsalis (Cope, 1880)
 †Protopsalis tigrinus (Cope, 1880)
 Genus: †Sarkastodon (Granger, 1938)
 †Sarkastodon henanensis (Tong & Lei, 1986)
 †Sarkastodon mongoliensis (Granger, 1938)

Phylogeny 
The phylogenetic relationships of the subfamily Oxyaeninae are shown in the following cladogram:

See also 
 Mammal classification
 Oxyaenidae

References 

 
Mammal subfamilies